An album is defined by the Official Charts Company (OCC) as being a type of music release that features more than four tracks and lasts longer than 25 minutes; from July 1956, sales of albums in the United Kingdom were monitored by music magazine Record Mirror. From November 1958, album sales were also compiled by music magazine Melody Maker. The biggest-selling album of the 1950s was the original soundtrack to the movie South Pacific.

Albums

References
General (chart positions)

Specific

1950s
1950s (UK)
1950s in British music
Best-selling albums 1950s